Hubert Westmoreland (January 28, 1915October 26, 2006) was a mechanic that became a car owner in the beginning of NASCAR. His role as a car owner ran from 1949 to 1964. In that time his cars were driven to four first -place finishes. His most notable victory was by Johnny Mantz, who drove his Plymouth to victory in the inaugural Southern 500 at Darlington Raceway in Darlington, South Carolina. His best finish at Daytona Beach Road Course was third, although when Mantz won the 1950 Southern 500, it was like winning the Daytona 500. Daytona International Speedway was not around until 1959.

A few of the other drivers that drove his cars were: Curtis Turner, Tim Flock, Bill Holland, Jack Smith, Frankie Schneider, and Herb Thomas.

References

External links
 

1915 births
2006 deaths
NASCAR team owners